The Wall Ministry was a Spanish government headed by Ricardo Wall which served between 15 May 1754 to 9 October 1763 during the reigns of Ferdinand VI and Charles III.

Wall came to power by thwarting the ambitions of his rival the Marquis of Ensenada. While Ensenada was pro-French and wanted to build an alliance with France to destroy British naval power, the Irish-descended Wall was supposed to be an Anglophile and his government steered Spain towards neutrality and friendly relations with Britain.

When the Seven Years' War broke out, Spain did not join with its traditional ally France but maintained a strict neutrality. However, when Charles III took the throne in 1759 he wanted to pursue a more pro-French policy, while retaining the popular and experienced Wall as Chief Minister. By the end of 1761 Spain was at war with Britain which had, as Wall had predicted, disastrous consequences for the Spanish who suffered a number of embarrassing military defeats to British forces (La Havana and Manila). He stepped down in 1763 following the Treaty of Paris, handing over power to Jerónimo Grimaldi.

Bibliography
 Browning, Reed. The Duke of Newcastle. Yale University Press, 1975.
 Hibbert, Christopher. George III: A Personal History. Penguin Books, 1999.
 Simms, Brendan. Three Victories and a Defeat: The Rise and Fall of the First British Empire. Penguin Books 2008.
 Téllez Alarcia, D., D. Ricardo Wall. Aut Caesar aut nullus, Madrid, 2008.
 Téllez Alarcia, D., Absolutismo e Ilustración en la España del s. XVIII. El Despotismo Ilustrado de D. Ricardo Wall, Madrid, 2010
 Téllez Alarcia, D., El ministerio Wall. La “España Discreta” del “Ministro Olvidado”, Madrid, 2012.

Spanish governments
1754 establishments in Spain
1763 disestablishments in Spain